The Concordia class is a class of cruise ships that are operated by Costa Cruises and Carnival Cruise Lines, subsidiaries of Carnival Corporation & plc.

The ship's design is based on the design of Carnival's  fleet of ships. However, their design from lido (pool) deck up to the top deck was enlarged and redesigned. The most notable difference is the structure around the main pool. The main pool features a glass exterior on both sides of the ship. A retractable macrodome was also added for the main pool. Another notable difference is the enlargement of its spa facilities. Each ship has a  wellness facility. Additional spa cabins were also included into the Concordia class.

Carnival operates only a single vessel in this class, which is marketed as a Splendor-class ship.  Including Carnival Splendor, there are currently five ships sailing in the Concordia class.

Incidents and accidents

 experienced a fire in her engine room on November 8, 2010, resulting in a loss of all electrical power and stranding the vessel with almost 4,500 on board.

 sank on January 13, 2012, after running aground shortly off the coast of Tuscany, resulting in 32 fatalities (33 including the later death of a salvage worker). The ship had departed from Civitavecchia on a seven-day Mediterranean cruise with 3,229 passengers and a crew of 1,023. The grounding caused a  gash in the hull, flooding the ship, causing her to list and drift toward the shore, where she later capsized and sank. Although the ship had sunk only partially and next to the shore, the evacuation was chaotic and her captain was subsequently arrested on preliminary charges of multiple manslaughter in connection with not only causing a shipwreck, but also failing to assist 300 passengers and failing to be the last to leave the wreck.

Vessels of the class

See also
List of cruise ship classes

References

External links 

 Costa Cruise Lines website
 Carnival Cruise Lines website

Cruise ship classes
Costa Cruises
Ships built by Fincantieri